Invented in 1896 by Joab R. Donaldson of Oliphant Furnace, Pennsylvania, US, the fireplace insert is a device inserted into an existing masonry or prefabricated wood fireplace. Joab was a 59-year-old coal miner and father of 14 at the time of his patent.  He came upon the idea as a means of using  coke  (a smokeless fuel made by the destructive distillation of certain types of coal) and incorporating the use of an electric blower to improve the efficiency.  The selection of coke and coal tailings as a primary fuel enabled low-income families to heat their Appalachian homes with small-size coal that they could easily dig for themselves in their own backyards.

Fireplace inserts are these days categorized primarily by the type of fuel used (natural gas, propane, EPA-certified wood, pellet, coal and electric), though many people associate them with burning wood.

Fireplace inserts are invariably made from cast iron or steel and most have self-cleaning glass doors that allow the flames of the fire to be viewed while the insulated doors remain closed, making the fire more efficient. This makes use of an "air wash" system whereby clean air is directed across the interior surface of the glass and thus prevents the buildup of deposits.

Today, many manufacturers also augment the operation of fireplace inserts by offering features such as fans and thermostatic controls, depending on the fuel type.  Typically, fresh air enters through vents below, circulates around the main chamber, where it is heated up, and the warmed air then exits through vents on the top of the unit.

Fireplace inserts are popular with people who have an existing open fireplace and chimney since they significantly improve both fuel efficiency and heat output whilst also providing an attractive focal point to a room. The disadvantages, when compared to a free-standing wood burning stove, are that they are more expensive to install and depend upon there being a usable fireplace and chimney in the first place.

Electric fireplace inserts are made to fit any size of a brick or steel-covered hearth. Electric fireplace inserts come in three form factors: electric log inserts (which imitate a natural wood flame), plug-in inserts, and built-in units. Plug-in electric fireplace inserts typically connect to a common 120-volt wall plug and are placed within an existing fireplace.

See also
 Stove
 Wood burning stove

References

Fireplaces